The Club Deportivo Guerreros de Xico is a Mexican football club based in Mexico City. The club was founded in 2021, and currently plays in the Serie B of Liga Premier.

History
The team was founded in June 2021 and was entered into the Liga Premier – Serie B on July 30, 2021. However, previously there was a related team that competed in the Liga TDP with the name Valle de Xico F.C., which played between 2019 and 2020.

The team played its first official game on September 18, 2021, in the game the Guerreros were defeated by Aguacateros C.D. Uruapan with a score of 0–6.

Stadium

The Estadio Jesús Martínez "Palillo" is a multi-use stadium located in the Magdalena Mixhuca Sports City in Mexico City. The stadium has a capacity of 6,000 people.

Players

Current squad

References

Association football clubs established in 2021
Football clubs in Mexico City
2021 establishments in Mexico
Liga Premier de México